Keith Jarrett (born 18 May 1948) is a Welsh former dual-code international rugby union and rugby league footballer who played in the 1960s and 1970s. He played representative rugby union (RU) for British Lions, Wales where he set point scoring records, and Monmouthshire, and at club level for Abertillery RFC, Newport RFC and London Welsh RFC, as a centre, i.e. number 12 or 13, and representative rugby league (RL) for Wales, and at club level for Barrow.

Early career 
Jarrett was born in Newport, Monmouthshire, the son of former Glamorgan cricketer Hal Jarrett, and attended Monmouth School. Like his father he also played cricket for Glamorgan County Cricket Club. In 1966 Keith Jarrett played rugby union for Newport against Ebbw Vale, shortly after leaving school.

Cricket 
Jarrett played for Glamorgan Second XI from 1965 to 1967, appearing in two first-class matches in 1967 – one each against the Indian and Pakistani tourists. He was a middle order bat and change right arm seam bowler.

International rugby career 
Jarrett played his first international for Wales on 15 April 1967 against England, aged eighteen years.  He had been selected at full back even though he had never played senior rugby in that position.  Newport were asked to play him at full back against Newbridge on the weekend before the international to give him some experience.  He did not seem to be much of a success in his new position and at half time, his captain David Watkins, switched him to centre. The following week Jarrett played in his first international and scored a breathtaking try.  England won a line-out in their own 25 (as it was then).  The ball was passed down the line to English centre, Colin McFadyean, who kicked towards the halfway line.  The ball bounced once and was seemingly going in to touch.  Instead, Jarret sprinted onto the ball, taking it without breaking stride. He sprinted down the touchline, outflanking the whole of the astonished England defence, to score in the left corner.  He converted his own try from just inside the touchline. Besides scoring a try, he kicked two penalty goals and five conversions for a total of 19 points.  His performance on the field was so impressive that the match has been known ever since as the Keith Jarrett match and he made the cover of Rugby World magazine two months later. The try has been voted seventh in a poll of the top ten Welsh tries and he is listed on the Welsh Rugby Union Official Website as the scorer of the "Greatest Ever Welsh try".

In 1968 he set a club record of 30 points for Newport against Penarth, and was selected for the 1968 British Lions tour to South Africa.

Jarrett played for Wales at rugby union ten times in all, making his final appearance against Australia on 21 June 1969 during the Wales tour of New Zealand and Australia.

Later career
On his return from tour in 1969, Jarrett joined rugby league club Barrow for a signing-on fee of £14,000 (based on increases in average earnings, this would be approximately £380,000 in 2016). He was also selected for the Welsh national rugby league side, before he had played his first match for Barrow. He was later transferred to Wigan, although he did not play from them.

Jarrett's rugby career was cut short in 1973, aged just 25, when he suffered a stroke resulting from a haemorrhage.

See also

List of cricket and rugby league players

References

External links
Back on the Wembley trail

1948 births
Living people
Abertillery RFC players
Barrow Raiders players
British & Irish Lions rugby union players from Wales
Dual-code rugby internationals
Glamorgan cricketers
London Welsh RFC players
Monmouthshire County RFC players
Newport HSOB RFC players
Newport RFC players
People educated at Monmouth School for Boys
Rugby league players from Newport, Wales
Rugby union players from Newport, Wales
Wales international rugby union players
Wales national rugby league team players
Welsh cricketers
Welsh rugby league players
Welsh rugby union players